Dick ten Cate (24 March 1914 – 13 December 1969) was a Dutch equestrian. He competed in the individual eventing at the 1948 Summer Olympics.

References

External links
 

1914 births
1969 deaths
Dutch male equestrians
Olympic equestrians of the Netherlands
Equestrians at the 1948 Summer Olympics
People from Purmerend
Sportspeople from North Holland